Thee Kulikkum Pachai Maram is a 2013 Indian Tamil-language directed by duo M.Vineesh and M.Prabheesh, starring  Prajin and Sarayu in lead roles.

Cast
Prajin as Pandi
Sarayu as Chandrika
Nizhalgal Ravi
M. S. Bhaskar
T. P. Gajendran
Yogi Babu as Selvam
Manimaran 
Saasha Nath

Release 
The New Indian Express wrote that " The film may have its glitches, but for those satiated with routine formula stuff, TKPM, in just about 112 minutes, offers a different viewing experience".

References

External links

2013 films
2010s Tamil-language films